The Midnight Cabaret is a 1923 American film directed by Larry Semon and featuring Oliver Hardy.

Cast
 Larry Semon as Larry, a Waiter
 Kathleen Myers as Kathleen, a Cabaret Performer
 Oliver Hardy as Oliver, an Impetuous Suitor (as Babe Hardy)
 Fred DeSilva
 William Hauber
 Al Thompson
 Joe Rock

See also
 List of American films of 1923
 Oliver Hardy filmography

References

External links

1923 films
1923 comedy films
1923 short films
American silent short films
American black-and-white films
Films directed by Larry Semon
Silent American comedy films
American comedy short films
1920s American films